Jarmecca Yvonne "Nikki" Whitehead (April 18, 1975 – January 13, 2010) was a 34-year-old mother of 16-year-old identical twins named Jasmiyah Kaneesha Whitehead and Tasmiyah Janeesha Whitehead (born on November 27, 1993). On the afternoon of January 13, 2010, she was found dead in the bathroom of her Conyers, Georgia, home in the Bridle Ridge Walk subdivision. She had been beaten with a vase and stabbed repeatedly. Her daughters, Jasmiyah ("Jas") and Tasmiyah ("Tas"), were arrested four months after the slaying on May 21, 2010, and charged with murder. Both initially pleaded not guilty. In a plea agreement, each twin pleaded guilty to the lesser charge of voluntary manslaughter in 2014. They were sentenced to serve 30 years in prison.

History
In 2000, 25-year-old Nikki met 55-year-old truck driver Robert Head. It was not long before she and the girls moved in with Robert in the city of Conyers, Georgia.

Tasmiyah and Jasmiyah were both honor roll students and Girl Scouts. The girls were initially raised by their great-grandmother, Della Frazier. Frazier said that Whitehead was a sporadic and random presence in her children's lives. In 2007, when the twins were 13, Whitehead requested custody of them. Whitehead and the twins clashed. Frazier said that the twins saw their mother's attempts to control them as hypocritical. The conflicts escalated to physical altercations and resulted in counseling and juvenile court appearances. Frazier was given custody again, only to have Whitehead regain custody on January 5, 2010. The girls protested the decision, but the court ordered them and their mother to live together for a two-week trial period. Whitehead was killed on January 13, 2010. The twins said that they discovered their mother dead. The medical examiner called the killing a crime of passion and not likely to have been performed by a stranger. Whitehead's boyfriend was cleared after DNA testing. Evidence, including bite marks attributed to wounds inflicted by their mother during the fight, implicated the twins, and they were charged in May 2010. Both initially pleaded not guilty.

Convictions
In January 2014, Tasmiyah pleaded guilty to voluntary manslaughter and was sentenced to 30 years in prison. On February 7, 2014, one month after her twin, Jasmiyah pleaded guilty and is serving the same sentence. The twins are incarcerated at separate prisons within the Georgia Department of Corrections. Tasmiyah is serving her sentence in Pulaski State Prison and Jasmiyah is serving her sentence in Arrendale State Prison. They were eligible for parole in 2017.

See also
 Matricide
 Parricide

References

2010 in Georgia (U.S. state)
2014 in Georgia (U.S. state)
 Criminal duos
Deaths by person in Georgia (U.S. state)
January 2010 events in the United States
Matricides